The Landgraf H-2 was an American single-seat twin-rotor helicopter designed by Fred Landgraf and built by the Landgraf Helicopter Company of Los Angeles, California. Although awarded a development contract by the United States Army, it was not developed and was overtaken by more advanced designs.

Design and development
Fred Landgraf formed the Landgraf Helicopter Company in September 1943 to develop and manufacture the H-2. It had an enclosed structure for one pilot and an 85 hp (63 kW) radial engine driving two rotors, each rotor fitted to a short boom on each side of the fuselage. It had a fixed tricycle landing gear. The H-2 first flew on 2 November 1944 and the company was awarded a development contract by the United States Army. It was not developed or bought and the company ceased operations by the end of the 1940s.

Unlike conventional helicopters, the H-2 used a tension-rod drive system to drive the side-by-side rotors. Control of blade pitch was also unconventional, with the blade shells rotating freely about the spars, controlled by ailerons near the tips.

Specifications

See also

References

Bibliography

External links
 

1940s United States military utility aircraft
1940s United States helicopters
H-2
Transverse rotor helicopters
Single-engined piston helicopters
Aircraft first flown in 1944